The 1991 Tour de France was the 78th edition of Tour de France, one of cycling's Grand Tours. The Tour began in Lyon with a prologue individual time trial on 6 July and Stage 12 occurred on 18 July with a mountainous stage from Pau. The race finished on the Champs-Élysées in Paris on 28 July.

Stage 12
18 July 1991 — Pau to Jaca (Spain),

Stage 13
19 July 1991 — Jaca (Spain) to Val-Louron,

Stage 14
20 July 1991 — Saint-Gaudens to Castres,

Stage 15
21 July 1991 — Albi to Alès,

Stage 16
22 July 1991 — Alès to Gap,

Stage 17
23 July 1991 — Gap to Alpe d'Huez,

Stage 18
24 July 1991 — Le Bourg-d'Oisans to Morzine,

Stage 19
25 July 1991 — Morzine to Aix-les-Bains,

Stage 20
26 July 1991 — Aix-les-Bains to Mâcon,

Stage 21
27 July 1991 — Lugny to Mâcon,  (ITT)

Stage 22
28 July 1991 — Melun to Paris Champs-Élysées,

References

1991 Tour de France
Tour de France stages